"Love Letter" is a song by Nick Cave and the Bad Seeds from their 2001 album, No More Shall We Part. A ballad written by Cave, it features him on vocals and piano with backing vocals by Kate & Anna McGarrigle.

"Love Letter" was first released as one of the songs on Nick Cave's 2000 spoken word album, The Secret Life of the Love Song.
Since its release by Nick Cave and the Bad Seeds on their 2001 album, No More Shall We Part, Uncut magazine has placed "Love Letter" at number 14 in its list of Nick Cave's greatest songs. The song was singled out for praise by author Jonathan Lethem, who says the "shattering simplicity" of its lyrics is "worthy of Shakespeare". In AllMusic's review of No More Shall We Part, "Love Letter" is described as a "tenderly daunting, haunted house". Author Robert Mighall described it as "a staggeringly beautiful song of forlorn love and a broken heart." Musician Victor Krummenacher described “Love Letter” as “extraordinary.”

References

Songs about letters (message)
Nick Cave songs
2002 singles
Rock ballads
Songs written by Nick Cave
2000 songs
Mute Records singles